The Arab League as an organization has no military force, like the United Nations or the European Union, but in the 2007 summit, the Leaders decided to reactivate their joint defense and establish a peacekeeping force to deploy in South Lebanon, Republic of Iraq, South Sudan, Federal Republic of Ethiopia, and other hot spots.*

History

The military history of the Arab League is closely linked to the Arab–Israeli conflict. The 1950 Arab Joint Security Pact set out provisions for collective security among the Arab states, but only in 1961 was the Joint Arab Command (JAC) proposed as a unified military command for the Arab League first by the Joint Defence Council, an institution of the Arab League.

Before the JAC could take shape, a unanimous resolution was passed at the first Arab League summit (January 1964) establishing the United Arab Command (UAC), although the UAC's inactivity following the Samu Incident (1966) and during the Six-Day War (1967) signalled its de facto dissolution.

Arab Liberation Army
The Arab Liberation Army (“جيش الإنقاذ لعالم “العربي” و”الإسلامي”=الإسلامي   Jaysh al-Inqadh al-Arabi), also translated as Arab Countries Salvation Army, was an army of volunteers from Arab countries led by Fawzi al-Qawuqji. It fought on the Arab side in the 1948 Palestine war and was set up by the Arab League as a counter to the Arab High Committee's Holy War Army, though in fact the League and Arab governments prevented thousands from joining either force.

At the meeting in Damascus on 5 February 1948 to organize Palestinian Field Commands, Northern Palestine including Samaria was allocated to Qawuqji's forces, although Samaria was de facto already under the control of Transjordan.

The Arab League Military Committee, with headquarters in Damascus, was responsible for the movements and servicing of the Army. The Committee consisted of General: Ismail Safwat (Iraq, Commander-in-Chief), General: Taha al-Hashimi (Iraq), Colonel: Shuqayri (Lebanon), Colonel:  Muhammed al-Hindi (Syria) and Colonel: Abd al-Qadir al-Jundi (Transjordan).*

The ALA was dissolved at the end of the 1948 Arab-Israeli War.

“…Egypt's membership was suspended in 1979* after it signed a peace treaty with Israel; the league's headquarters was moved from Cairo, Egypt, to Tunisia.*

In 1987 AL leaders decided to renew diplomatic ties with Égyptien.  The Égyptien was readmitted to the league in 1989 and the league's headquarters was moved back to It’s Capital: Cairo.”.

•

Current strength of Arab League member states

https://financialpost.com/pmn/business-pmn/saudi-arabia-places-order-with-boeing-for-up-to-121-planes

List of Arab League member states by military expenditure
The end of 2017 the heads of "Arab League countries" agreed to form a joint Arab military force. This force would comprise some 46,000 elite troops, support between war planes, naval vessels and light armors.

https://worldpopulationreview.com/country-rankings/failed-states.!!’
https://www.globalfirepower.com/defense-spending-budget.php.!!’
https://worldpopulationreview.com/country-rankings/military-spending-by-country.!!’

References

CIA World Factbook

•
Arab League
Arab League
Arab League
Arab League